Distant Light is a 1971 album released by the Hollies, their 11th UK album and their last before brief departure of lead vocalist and founding member Allan Clarke (who was absent on the following album and returned for their 1974 self-titled album), and reputedly the first album to come out of AIR Studios.  The album spawned two hit singles: the Allan Clarke penned "Long Cool Woman in a Black Dress", which peaked at number two in the US and number 32 in the UK; and Tony Hicks penned "Long Dark Road", which reached number 26 in the US.  The US version of the album peaked at number 21 in the album charts.  The summer scene on the cover is rendered as a winter scene on the next Hollies album Romany.

Overview and recording
The album was the band's biggest experiment to date. The use of saxophones, girl choruses, and more complex compositions in the style of the Moody Blues ("You Know The Score"), was very unusual for the Hollies. The lyrics were more serious, containing, for example, anti-war messages ("You Know The Score" or "Promised Land") or dramatic stories ("What A Life I've Led", "Hold On"). Only a few songs were in the traditional Hollies style and sound ("Long Dark Road", "A Little Thing Like Love", "To Do with Love").

The recording featured guest appearances by pianist Gary Brooker (Procol Harum), guitarist Mick Abrahams (Jethro Tull) and saxophonist Jim Jewell. Vocals were sung by Madeline Bell, Doris Troy and Liza Strike. The LP was released on 8 October 1971 in a gatefold sleeve with a painted woodland and summer scene by Colin Elgie of Hipgnosis. The idea was conceived by Storm Thorgerson, famous for his work with Pink Floyd. There were many hidden messages and a good deal of symbolism and, years later, the artist admitted that there were so many that he couldn't remember some of them. The inside cover art consisted of pictures of the band members taken at a house party at Tony Hicks' apartment.

Release and reception
The band performed the first three songs from the album ("What a Life I've Led" and "Look What We've Got" and "Long Cool Woman in a Black Dress") live on the television show "Meet the Hollies" on July 25, 1971. Later, they performed "Long Cool Woman in a Black Dress" and "A Little Thing Like Love" again on another TV show, "It's Lulu". The album was highly praised by critics, Record Mirror wrote: "You could use the word sensational about The Hollies' new album." and it became the biggest success they've had in America (including records with Graham Nash). However, in their native United Kingdom, the LP was only a modest success for the band. The album's biggest hit was the song "Long Cool Woman in a Black Dress", composed by Allan Clarke and Roger Cook (whose co-writer Roger Greenaway was also credited by verbal agreement between the two songwriters). The single reached No. 2 in America, No. 1 in Canada and No. 32 in England. It was the Hollies' biggest American hit ever. The song "Long Dark Road" was also released as a single in America and reached No. 26 (and No. 24 in Canada).

Track listing
All tracks composed by Tony Hicks and Kenny Lynch; except where indicated

Side one
"What a Life I've Led" – 3:58
"Look What We've Got" – 4:07
"Hold On" (Allan Clarke) – 4:07
"Pull Down the Blind" (Terry Sylvester) – 3:30
"To Do with Love" – 3:29
"Promised Land" – 4:20
Side two
"Long Cool Woman in a Black Dress" (Allan Clarke, Roger Cook, Roger Greenaway) – 3:19
"You Know the Score" (Terry Sylvester, Allan Clarke) – 5:37
"Cable Car" (Terry Sylvester) – 4:25
"A Little Thing Like Love" (Allan Clarke, Tony Macaulay) – 3:19
"Long Dark Road" – 4:16

Personnel
The Hollies
Allan Clarke – lead vocals and backing vocals, lead guitar on "Long Cool Woman"
Tony Hicks – lead guitars and bass
Terry Sylvester – rhythm guitars
Bernie Calvert – bass
Bobby Elliott – drums
with:
John Scott - arrangements, conductor
Gary Brooker - organ and piano on "Long Dark Road"
Mick Abrahams - pedal-steel guitar on "What A Life I've Led"
Jim Jewell - saxophone
Madeline Bell, Doris Troy and Liza Strike - backing vocals on "What A Life I've Led"

Chart positions
Album

References

1971 albums
The Hollies albums
Parlophone albums
Epic Records albums
Albums with cover art by Hipgnosis
Albums produced by Ron Richards (producer)
Albums produced by Allan Clarke (singer)
Albums produced by Tony Hicks
Albums produced by Terry Sylvester
Albums produced by Bernie Calvert
Albums produced by Bobby Elliott
Albums conducted by John Scott (composer)
Albums arranged by John Scott (composer)
Albums recorded at AIR Studios